Minority Rules is the debut album by punk band Whole Wheat Bread. It was released on January 25, 2005 by Fighting Records. The CD contains three hidden tracks which are hip hop songs.

Track listing
"Broke" – 2:15
"Loud & Clear" – 1:26
"Old Man Samson" – 1:55
"Miss Perfection" – 2:19
"Scar Your Lungs" – 2:23
"Police Song" – 2:28
"Holly" – 1:50
"No Future" – 2:14
"Feel Like Shit" – 3:14
"Overrated" – 1:46
"Miss the Bus" – 1:00
"1:11" – 1:11
"Stress in My Life"(hidden track) – 3:12
"Dirty South"(hidden track) – 2:41
"Throw Them Things Up"(hidden track) – 4:12

Personnel
Aaron Abraham – guitar, vocals
Nick Largen – bass, vocals
Joseph Largen  – drums

2005 debut albums
Whole Wheat Bread (band) albums